Gegham Harutyunyan (born 23 August 1990) is an Armenian professional footballer who plays as a forward for Noah.

Club career
Harutyunyan's first senior club was Ulisses, with whom he made his debut for in the 2008 Armenian Cup. Harutyunyan's first appearance in league football came in 2012 vs. Mika. In his final campaign with Ulisses, Harutyunyan scored two goals in twenty-four matches; the last coming against Shirak in May 2014. Gandzasar Kapan completed the signing of Harutyunyan a month later. After scoring twenty-four goals in 2016–17 and 2017–18, which included four goals in a game with Ararat Yerevan on 1 May 2018 - the first was Gandzasar's 400th goal in top-flight history, Harutyunyan departed Armenia to play in Kazakhstan for Shakhter Karagandy on loan two months after. A debut professional appearance arrived on 5 August versus Kairat.

International career
Harutyunyan was selected in Armenia's senior squad in October 2016 for 2018 FIFA World Cup qualifiers against Poland and Romania. However, he was an unused substitute on both occasions.

Career statistics
.

Honours
Gandzasar Kapan
Armenian Cup: 2017–18

References

External links

1990 births
Living people
Footballers from Yerevan
Armenian footballers
Association football forwards
Armenian expatriate footballers
Expatriate footballers in Kazakhstan
Armenian expatriate sportspeople in Kazakhstan
Armenian Premier League players
Kazakhstan Premier League players
Ulisses FC players
FC Gandzasar Kapan players
FC Shakhter Karagandy players